Kurt Erich Schulz was born on December 12, 1968 in Wenatchee, Washington to Erich and Judy Schulz. He is a former American football player in the National Football League. He played 10 years, eight for the Buffalo Bills, and two for the Detroit Lions. He played college football at Eastern Washington University.

Career
He began playing football in his junior year at Dwight D. Eisenhower High School in Yakima, Washington after notable successes in soccer and track lead coaches and football players there to request he join the team.  Kurt had an immediate impact on the team playing the safety position and returning punts for the Cadets.  He subsequently suffered a serious on-field leg injury but was still able to be noticed by and recruited to Eastern Washington University to play football in 1987.  Following a successful career at safety for the Eagles, he was drafted by the Buffalo Bills of the National Football League in 1992.

After being let go by the Lions in 2001, Schulz worked for Merrill Lynch.

References

1968 births
Living people
People from Wenatchee, Washington
American football safeties
Buffalo Bills players
Detroit Lions players
Eastern Washington Eagles football players